Kovon Rural LLG is a local-level government (LLG) of Madang Province, Papua New Guinea.

Wards
01. Salemp
02. Sonvak
03. Aranam
22. Hangaple
23. Aradip
24. Sangapi
25. Dangu
26. Gebrau
27. Tingi
28. Yilu
29. Mamusi
30. Fitako
31. Gubaine
32. Wulim
33. Yahl

References

Local-level governments of Madang Province